Retzer Land Heliport  is a private-use heliport in Retz, Niederösterreich, Austria.

See also
List of airports in Austria

References

External links 
 Airport record for Retzer Land Heliport at Landings.com

Airports in Lower Austria
Heliports in Austria